|}

This is a list of results for the Legislative Council at the 2006 South Australian state election.

Continuing members 

The following MLCs were not up for re-election this year.

 Sitting Labor MLC Terry Roberts died on 18 February 2006, one month before the election. Labor candidate Bernard Finnigan was appointed as his replacement after the election on 2 May 2006 to serve the rest of Roberts's term. 
 Liberal MLC Angus Redford resigned from the Legislative Council in March 2006 in an unsuccessful attempt to shift to the House of Assembly. Liberal candidate Stephen Wade was appointed for the remaining four years of Redford's term on 2 May 2006.

Election results

See also
 Candidates of the 2006 South Australian state election
 Members of the South Australian Legislative Council, 2006–2010

References

2006
2006 elections in Australia
2000s in South Australia